The Vietnamese National Badminton Championships is a tournament organized by the Vietnam Badminton Federation to crown the best badminton players in Vietnam.

Past winners

References

External links 
 Official website

Badminton tournaments in Vietnam
National badminton championships
Sports competitions in Vietnam